Falsamblesthis taeniata is a species of beetle in the family Cerambycidae. It was described by Belon in 1903. It is known from Bolivia.

References

Forsteriini
Beetles described in 1903